Brent Grgic (born 8 October 1979) is a former Australian rules footballer  who played five seasons for Melbourne, before playing two seasons for Geelong in the Australian Football League (AFL).

External links
 

1979 births
Living people
Australian rules footballers from Victoria (Australia)
Melbourne Football Club players
Geelong Football Club players
Australian people of Croatian descent
Geelong Falcons players